Georg Lindemann (8 March 1884 – 25 September 1963) was a German general during World War II. He commanded the 18th Army during the Soviet Kingisepp–Gdov Offensive.

World War II
In 1936, Lindemann was promoted to Generalmajor and given command of the 36th Infantry Division which took part in the Invasion of France. Lindemann was promoted to full General and given command of the L Army Corps. In June 1941, at the launch of Operation Barbarossa, Lindemann's Corps was a part of Army Group North. Lindemann commanded the corps during the advance towards Leningrad. His unit was briefly shifted to the command of Army Group Centre during the Battle of Smolensk. Lindemann's corps was then shifted back to Army Group North.

On 16 January 1942, Lindemann took the command of the 18th Army, a part of Army Group North. In the summer of 1942, he was promoted to Generaloberst. Lindemann commanded the 18th Army throughout the campaigns around Leningrad and during the January 1944 retreat from the Oranienbaum Bridgehead to Narva. He was promoted to command of Army Group North on 31 March 1944. On 4 July 1944, he was relieved and transferred to the Reserve Army. On 1 February 1945, he was appointed to the command of all German troops in Denmark as the "Supreme Commander of the Armed Forces in Denmark". Germany surrendered unconditionally in northwest Germany, the Netherlands, and Denmark on 5 May 1945. Lindemann was then given the task of dismantling the German occupation of Denmark until 6 June 1945, when he was arrested at his headquarters in Silkeborg. He was held in American custody until 1948. Lindemann died in 1963 in Freudenstadt,  West Germany.

Awards and decorations
 Iron Cross (1914) 2nd Class (9 September 1914) & 1st Class  (28 July 1915)
 Clasp to the Iron Cross (1939) 2nd Class (26 September 1939) & 1st Class  (30 October 1939)
 Knight's Cross of the Iron Cross with Oak Leaves
 Knight's Cross on 5 August 1940 as Generalleutnant and commander of the 36. Infantry-Division
 Oak Leaves on 21 August 1943 as Generaloberst and commander of the 18.Armee
The soviet city of Gatschina near Leningrad was renamed after him in Lindemannstadt between 1942 and 1944.

References

Citations

Bibliography

 
 

1884 births
1963 deaths
People from Osterburg (Altmark)
People from the Province of Saxony
German Army generals of World War II
Colonel generals of the German Army (Wehrmacht)
Prussian Army personnel
German Army personnel of World War I
Reichswehr personnel
Recipients of the Knight's Cross of the Iron Cross with Oak Leaves
Recipients of the clasp to the Iron Cross, 1st class
Military personnel from Saxony